Fayu Temple, also called Stone Temple, is one of three major temples in Mount Putuo, Zhejiang, China. Its grand hall was rebuilt in 1699 during the Qing dynasty (1644–1911).

History
Fayu Temple is the second largest temple in Mount Putuo, and a national key Buddhist temple designated by the State Council. In 1580 during the Ming dynasty (1368–1644), a monk of Macheng, named Dazhi Zhenrong, came from western Sichuan to Mount Putuo for training. He was attracted by the local scenery and built a small sanctuary named "Ocean Tide", meaning "Buddhist Ocean Guanyin". In 1594, the governor Wu Anguo renamed it "Ocean Tide Temple". It was destroyed by fire in 1598. In 1605, it was renovated and expanded. In the following year, the central government granted a plaque "National Defense Ocean Pacifying Temple", as well as an inscription called "Dragon Treasure". It suffered through several wars and fire.

In 1687 during the Qing dynasty (1644–1911), the temple was refurbished and expanded again. In 1699, the Kangxi Emperor granted a plaque "Heavenly Flowers Dharma Rain". Thus, it changed to "Dharma Rain Temple", or "Fayu Temple". In 1731, the Yongzheng Emperor ordered a large-scale renovation project. Thereafter, it became a famous temple in southeast China.

Architecture
Aligned on the central axis are the Hall of Four Heavenly Kings, Bell tower, Hall of Jade Buddha, Hall of Guanyin, Hall of Imperial Tablet, Mahavira Hall, Buddhist Texts Library, and the Hall of Abbot.

Area

Along the trend of the mountain from lower to higher are Heavenly Kings Hall, Jade Buddhist Hall, Nine-Dragon Guanyin Hall, Emperor Tablet Hall, Great Grand Hall, and Fangzhang Hall.

Front door
The front door of the temple is not located along the axial line, but on the southeast corner. It is a double-eaved square pavilion, different from average front doors of Buddhist temple. The front plaque reads "Heavenly Flowers Colorful Rain", written in gold on blue ground. Inside the door, to the west is the shadowy wall. It was originally a three-dragon wall carved on bricks, with Buddhist words meaning "unbelievable power". Unfortunately, the wall was pulled down during the Cultural Revolution. In 1987, on the site erected a Nine-Dragon Wall.

Hall of Guanyin
The Hall of Guanyin is also called "Nine Dragon Hall", in which the nine dragon wall is bluestone embossed with exquisite craftsmanship and life-like Chinese dragons. The entire piece came from the nine dragon palace in the Forbidden City in Beijing during the Ming dynasty (1368–1644). The Hall of Guanyin ranks in the highest architectural status of Buddhist temples. It is acclaimed as one of three treasures in Mount Putuo. Statue of Guanyin is enshrined in the center with Eighteen Arhats lining up on both sides.

References

Bibliography
 

Buddhist temples on Mount Putuo
Major National Historical and Cultural Sites in Zhejiang
Ming dynasty architecture
Qing dynasty architecture
Buildings and structures in Zhoushan
Tourist attractions in Zhoushan
1699 establishments in China
17th-century Buddhist temples
Religious buildings and structures completed in 1699